The dalit is a type of short Filipino poem, consisting of four lines with eight syllables each. 

There is a controversy regarding its origin. One school of thought states that the dalit is Spanish in origin, particularly because its syllabification is even or pares. Hence, it is said that the Spanish popularized the dalit in the Philippines.  Another view holds that the dalit is indigenous, but the friars used its popularity to promote Catholicism, in the form of meditative verses.

See also
Awit (poem)

References

Philippine poetry